Little Aurore's Tragedy ( "little Aurore, the child Martyr") is a Canadian 1952 Quebec biographical drama movie that was directed by Jean-Yves Bigras, produced by L'Alliance Cinematographique Canadienne and distributed by Renaissance Films Distribution and Warner Bros.

A classic of early Quebec cinema, La Petite Aurore l’enfant martyre was based on a true story. Aurore (Laflamme) is 12 years old and lives with her sickly mother (McKinnon) and father (Desmarteaux) in a small village during the 1920s. A widowed neighbour (Mitchell) appears concerned and helpful, but Aurore discovers she actually hastens her mother's death. Her father marries the widow, and the child is forced to live with her cruel stepmother. She is systematically beaten and tortured until the local doctor (Gagnon) intervenes, but he is too late, and Aurore succumbs to her abuse. This film was remade in 2005 by Luc Dionne and was named Aurore.

Production
The film had a budget of $59,000.

References

Works cited

See also
 Aurore Gagnon

External links

1952 films
Quebec films
Canadian biographical drama films
1950s biographical drama films
Canadian black-and-white films
1950s French-language films
French-language Canadian films
1950s Canadian films